Saints Row: Undercover, originally titled Saints Row: The Fall, is a story-based game in the Saints Row series developed by Volition for the Sony PlayStation Portable. Originally cancelled after being in development in 2009, a development build of the game was eventually released free of charge by Volition in 2016, in ISO format through the website Unseen64.

The game involves playing as a corrupt undercover policeman in the city of Stilwater, with the goal of completing various missions around the city.

References

2016 video games
Cancelled PlayStation Portable games
PlayStation Portable games
PlayStation Portable-only games
Saints Row
Video games about police officers
Video games developed in the United States